Diodoros or Diodorus ; born Damianos G. Karivalis  (14 August 1923 – 20 December 2000) was the Patriarch of Jerusalem in the Eastern Orthodox Patriarchate of Jerusalem from 1980 to 2000.

He was born on the Greek island of Chios on 14 August 1923. He became a monk in 1943 and was renamed Diodoros. Three years later he became a priest, then an archbishop of Hierapolis in 1965. He served in Hierapolis prior to his election and was Patriarchal Exarch in Amman, Jordan, until 1980 when he was raised to the Patriarchate.

References 
 

20th-century Greek Orthodox Patriarchs of Jerusalem
Grand Crosses of the Order of the Star of Romania
Greek expatriates in Israel
1923 births
2000 deaths
Clergy from Chios
Greek expatriates in Jordan